William Mark Hughes (18 December 1932 – 19 March 1993) was a Labour politician and an economic historian.

Hughes was Member of Parliament for Durham from 1970 to 1983, and the (slightly renamed) City of Durham from 1983 to 1987, when he stood down.  From 1975 to 1979, he was also appointed a Member of the European Parliament as part of the Labour delegation.

Hughes grew up in Durham, where his father was Professor of History. He attended Durham School then won a scholarship to Balliol College, Oxford, graduating in 1956. He followed this with a PhD at King's College, Durham (now Newcastle University) in 1958, where he remained as the Sir James Knott Research Fellow until 1960. He worked as a staff tutor in the extra-mural studies department of Manchester University from 1960 until 1964, when he moved to a lecturing position at Durham University that he held until he entered parliament. He died in Aberystwyth in 1993.

References 
Times Guide to the House of Commons, 1983

Specific

External links 
 

1932 births
1993 deaths
Labour Party (UK) MPs for English constituencies
Labour Party (UK) MEPs
UK MPs 1970–1974
UK MPs 1974
UK MPs 1974–1979
UK MPs 1979–1983
UK MPs 1983–1987
MEPs for the United Kingdom 1973–1979
Alumni of King's College, Newcastle
Members of the Parliament of the United Kingdom for City of Durham